Planalto ("plateau" in Portuguese) is a municipality in the state of São Paulo in Brazil. The population is 5,304 (2020 est.) in an area of 290 km2. Its original name was that of Avanhandava.

References

External links
 Planalto municipality webpage in Brazilian Portuguese

Municipalities in São Paulo (state)